Park Woo-hyeok is a South Korean taekwondo practitioner. He won the gold medal in the men's welterweight event at the 2022 World Taekwondo Championships held in Guadalajara, Mexico. He also won one of the bronze medals in his event at the 2019 World Taekwondo Championships held in Manchester, United Kingdom.

He won one of the bronze medals in his event at the 2021 Asian Taekwondo Championships held near Beirut, Lebanon.

References

External links
 

Living people
Year of birth missing (living people)
Place of birth missing (living people)
South Korean male taekwondo practitioners
World Taekwondo Championships medalists
Asian Taekwondo Championships medalists
21st-century South Korean people